Lei Uk Tsuen or Lei Uk Village is a village in Ta Kwu Ling, North District, Hong Kong.

Administration
Lei Uk Tsuen is a recognized village under the New Territories Small House Policy. It is one of the villages represented within the Ta Kwu Ling District Rural Committee. For electoral purposes, Lei Uk Tsuen is part of the Sha Ta constituency, which is currently represented by Ko Wai-kei.

History
At the time of the 1911 census, the population of Lei Uk Tsuen was 94. The number of males was 41.

References

Villages in North District, Hong Kong